Christopher Michael Massey (born January 26, 1990) is an American actor, best known for his role as Michael Barret on the Nickelodeon television series Zoey 101 (2005–2008).

Career
Massey started his acting career at a young age, appearing in commercials for Cap'n Crunch and Pop Tarts. He  also has made a guest appearance on Punk'd. He won 2002's Young Artist Award for Outstanding Young Performer in Live Theatre for his role as Young Simba in The Lion King.

Massey had his first starring role as Michael Barret in the Nickelodeon television show Zoey 101. When the show debuted in January 2005, it drew a larger number of viewers aged 9–14 than any premiere on the network in the preceding eight years. Zoey 101 was nominated for an Emmy for Outstanding Children's Program in 2005.

Massey is the older brother of Kyle Massey, star of Disney shows Cory in the House, That's So Raven, and Fish Hooks. He guest-starred alongside his brother in a That's So Raven episode titled "Five Finger Discount". The Massey brothers have also had small roles on the sitcom The Parkers, have appeared together on The Steve Wilkos Show, and have released music together as the Massey Boyz.

On January 12, 2023, Jamie Lynn Spears announced that production had begun on a sequel film entitled, Zoey 102, set to premiere in 2023 on Paramount+, with original series cast members Spears, Massey, Sean Flynn, Erin Sanders, Matthew Underwood, Jack Salvatore Jr., and Abby Wilde reprising their roles. Production began in January 2023 in North Carolina. Nancy Hower is currently attached to direct, with  Spears attached as executive producer.

Personal life
Massey has three children, a daughter named Mariah by reality TV personality Cassalei "Cassie" Jackson, whose mother is actress Shar Jackson, and a daughter named Bella and a son named Carter by Bria Miller, to whom he was previously engaged in 2020.  He is an older brother to actor Kyle Massey.

In March 2015, Massey was assaulted and robbed by rapper Lil Twist at his brother's home in Los Angeles. The rapper reportedly brought four others to aid him in the assault and robbery of the brothers, as well as brass knuckles, and stole Massey's Rolex watch before leaving. Lil Twist pleaded no contest to burglary, grand theft, making criminal threats, battery, and two counts of assault with a deadly weapon and was sentenced to one year in prison.

In April 2016, TMZ reported that Massey had been arrested and charged with domestic violence, following an incident involving Jackson as they were leaving a nightclub. Massey denied the allegations that he had shoved Jackson, saying the two had been arguing loudly when Jackson fell down, causing security to assume he'd shoved her. Jackson declined to press charges against Massey.

In July 2017, Massey was granted a temporary restraining order against Shar Jackson, his daughter Mariah's maternal grandmother. He told courts that he'd left Mariah in the care of her mother and grandmother for several weeks and that during the time, Jackson had struck Mariah and left a four-inch long gash in her forehead from a razor. A representative for Jackson denied Massey's claims of abuse.

Filmography

Film

Television

Awards and nominations

References

External links

1990 births
African-American male actors
American male child actors
American singer-songwriters
American male television actors
American male voice actors
Living people
Rappers from Atlanta
21st-century American male actors
21st-century American rappers
21st-century African-American male singers
American male singer-songwriters